is a Japanese former professional racing cyclist, who currently works as a directeur sportif for UCI Continental team .

Career
Born in Izu, Shizuoka Prefecture, Nodera graduated from Hosei University and became a professional in 1998 with Shimano Racing, the team operated by Shimano. He joined the Italian team Colpack–Astro in 2001 and became only the second Japanese to complete the Giro d'Italia, after Masatoshi Ichikawa in 1990. Returning to Shimano, he continued to ride in both Europe and Asia, becoming Japanese national champion in 2005 and 2008. He retired in 2010, finishing third in his last race, the Japanese National Road Race Championships. With that result, he finished on the podium for eight straight years in the national championship.

Major results

2003
 1st  Overall Jelajah Malaysia
 2nd Road race, National Road Championships
2004
 3rd Road race, National Road Championships
2005
 1st  Road race, National Road Championships
2006
 2nd Road race, National Road Championships
2007
 2nd Road race, National Road Championships
2008
 1st  Road race, National Road Championships
2009
 1st Challenge Cycle Road Race
 3rd Road race, National Road Championships
2010
 3rd Road race, National Road Championships

Grand Tour general classification results timeline

References

External links

Shimano Racing Official site (Japanese)

1975 births
Living people
Japanese male cyclists
Sportspeople from Shizuoka Prefecture